St. Armand is a town in Essex County, New York, United States. The population was 1,548 at the 2010 census. The town was named by an early settler for Saint-Armand, Quebec, in Canada.

The town of St. Armand is in the northwestern corner of the county and is southwest of Plattsburgh.

History 
The town was first settled circa 1829. The early industry was based on lumber production. After most of the trees were harvested, farming became predominant. Because the town was set at the conjunction of five roads, including New York Route 3, it became an active community. 

The town was set off from the town of Wilmington in 1844.

By the end of the 19th century, the town had become the locale for sanatoria intended for tuberculosis (TB) cures. Dr. Edward Trudeau, in 1884, was one of the first to establish a sanatorium within the town, near the village of Saranac Lake.

Notable person
Robert Louis Stevenson, author, spent one year in St. Armand  for a TB cure

Geography

The northern and eastern town lines are the border of Franklin County. The town is in the Adirondack Park. The Saranac River flows through the northwestern part of St. Armand.

New York State Route 3 passes through the western part of the town.

Demographics

At the 2000 census, there were 1,321 people, 543 households and 349 families residing in the town.  The population density was 23.4 per square mile (9.0/km2). There were 689 housing units at an average density of 12.2 per square mile (4.7/km2). The racial makeup of the town was 97.43% White, 0.38% African American, 0.61% Native American, 0.23% Asian, 0.61% from other races, and 0.76% from two or more races. Hispanic or Latino of any race were 1.14% of the population.

There were 543 households, of which 32.4% had children under the age of 18 living with them, 55.1% were married couples living together, 7.7% had a female householder with no husband present, and 35.7% were non-families. 28.2% of all households were made up of individuals, and 13.4% had someone living alone who was 65 years of age or older. The average household size was 2.43 and the average family size was 3.04.

Age distribution was 25.8% under the age of 18, 6.3% from 18 to 24, 29.1% from 25 to 44, 26.6% from 45 to 64, and 12.3% who were 65 years of age or older. The median age was 39 years. For every 100 females, there were 98.1 males. For every 100 females age 18 and over, there were 90.7 males.

The median household income was $39,500, and the median family income was $51,250. Males had a median income of $36,696 versus $23,828 for females. The per capita income for the town was $18,828. About 4.0% of families and 8.1% of the population were below the poverty line, including 9.6% of those under age 18 and 11.0% of those age 65 or over.

Communities and locations in St. Armand 
Bloomingdale – A hamlet near the northern town line on NY-3. The community was founded circa 1852.
Camp Woodsmoke – A youth camp formerly located at the northern end of Lake Placid.
Franklin Falls Pond – A wide part of the Saranac River at the northern town boundary.
Lake Placid – A small part of the northern end of the lake is within the town.
Moose Pond – A small lake in the western part of St. Armand.
Saranac Lake – A small part of the village of Saranac Lake is in the southeastern part of the town.
St. Armand – A location near the northern town line on NY-3.
Trudeau – A hamlet northeast of Saranac Lake village on NY-3, named for Dr. Edward Livingston Trudeau.

References

External links
 Town of St. Armand official website
 Historical summary of St. Armand
 Early history of St. Armond, NY
 Historic St. Armand photos

Towns in Essex County, New York